Pogradec is the eleventh most populous city in Albania and the capital of the eponymous municipality. It is located on a narrow plain between two mountain chains along the southwestern banks of the Lake of Ohrid. Its climate is profoundly influenced by a seasonal Mediterranean and Continental climate. The total population is 61,530, of which 20,848 in the municipal unit (the pre-2015 municipality) Pogradec (2011 census).

Pogradec and its surroundings were listed by UNESCO as a World Heritage Site as part of the natural and cultural heritage of the region of Ohrid. Nevertheless, the Illyrian Royal Tombs in the adjacent unit of Proptisht are on the Albanian tentative list for becoming a World Heritage Site.

Etymology 

The name of the town is Eastern South Slavic in origin. Pogradec comes from Po(d) (under/beneath) and Gradec (town, city, castle or fortified settlement) and means literally "under the city". This is a reference to the ancient Illyrian settlement, which was situated on a hill above the contemporary region of Pogradec. In the medieval period during the Ottoman occupation, the town was known as İstarova or İstarye during Ottoman rule and was bounded to as kaza center in Görice Sanjak of Manastır Vilayet before Balkan Wars.

History 

From the 8th until the 14th century, Pogradec area was captured by various medieval states such as the Bulgarian, Byzantine and Serbian Empires as well as by noble Albanian families such as Gropa. In the middle of 15th century the area became part of Skanderbeg state and after his death in 1468, it was invaded by the Ottomans who kept it until Albania's Independence in 1912. During their occupation Pogradec was the center of the kaza of Starova and was developed as a small town of craftsmen and fishermen. When the Turkish traveler Evliya Celebi visited the area in 1662 he wrote that "Pogradec was a sweet city with red roofs, four neighborhoods, four mosques, two elementary schools, six hundred houses and one hundred and fifty shops".

During the second half of the 19th century and beginning of the 20th century, Pogradec area played an important role in the Albanian National Renaissance. In 14 March 1887 the second Albanian language school was started here.

During WWI Pogradec became a battlefield divided between the enemy fronts. From 1914 until 1920 Austro-Hungarian, Serbian, Greek, Bulgarian and French armies, captured the city replacing each-other from time to time.

During WWII the city was first invaded by the Italian army in 12 April 1939. Italian occupation of Pogradec was interrupted due to Greco-Italian War and Greek troops occupied the city between 30 November 1940 and 14 April 1941. After Italy's capitulation in 1943 the Italians were replaced by German Wehrmacht units who held the city until 30 August 1944 when it was liberated by the Albanian partisans.

After the war the town was a favorite summer escape for many communist government officials and particularly Enver Hoxha. The summer residences and the area around them were sealed off from the public.

Geography 

The mountain chain of Mali i Thatë in the Prespa National Park rises in the east of the city and divides the region from the Lake of Prespa.

Climate 

The climate of the Lake Ohrid is classified as a local-continental type because of a microclime that is created in that area influenced by Mediterranean climate. The average annual rainfall in the Lake basin amount to approximately 730 mm.

Economy 

Pogradec is located about 139 km from Tirana, the capital city of Albania, 40 km from Korça, and 5 km from North Macedonia.
Pogradec is the last railway station: Tirana - Durrës - Elbasan - Librazhd - Pogradec and located along SH3 road that passes through Devoll and continues to Greece.
However, the train service now finishes at Elbasan, and parts of the line from there on are derelict.  There are some proposals to revive the line and extend it to connect to the Greek railway network.
Translake transport started on 15 June 2014 with a tourist ferry between Pogradec and Ohrid, but the service is sporadic and unreliable.

Culture 

Pogradec is well known for its famous writers and poets such as Lasgush Poradeci and Mitrush Kuteli, and lately Luan Starova. Their works are a crucial part of Albanian literature.

The main characters of Luan Starova's cycle of novels, "The Balkan Saga", are the author's own parents and their family, who fled Pogradec for Macedonia during World War II. Separated from their old hometown and their relatives by the Albania-Yugoslavia border during the Enver Hoxha's era, they would often look at Pogradec through a binocular from the vantage point of Monastery of Saint Naum on the other side of the lake.

Pogradec is also the home of nationally acclaimed painters like Anastas Kostandini(Taso), Gjergji Lako, Gentian Zeka, Vangjo Vasili and Ilir Dhima. All kinds of sports are practiced in town, especially by the youth.

Pogradec has a professional soccer team (currently in the Superliga, the best division in Albania) which holds the name Pogradeci. There are several varsity soccer teams mainly composed of high school students. Even volleyball and basketball are played competitively. During the summer, beach volleyball draws the attention of all the residents. Many professional volleyball teams from Albania and other Balkanic countries participate in a championship which lasts about two weeks. Pogradeci team has been awarded the first prize several times. Other sports to mention are swimming and boxing. The boxing team, "Dragoi", is one of the top teams in the nation and has always trained champions.

Pogradec also has a rich folklore. Many songs and dances have been created throughout the centuries. Their themes are based on the beauty of the lake and a love for nature.

Some of the main recurring cultural events in the city are:

"Puppet Theater Festival" - Takes place every June. Participants vary from national to European level.

"Lake Day" - Takes place in 21 June. All the towns surrounding lake Ohrid (Pogradec, Ohrid and Struga) gather in a festival where local delicacies, including food and culture are showcased.

"Balkan Film Food Festival" - Takes place in September. Balkan movies, documentaries and culinary are showcased throughout the days of the festival.

"Wine Fest" - Takes place in December. Pogradec families compete together for the best homemade wine in the city. The days of the festival are accompanied by great food and live music.

 
 
Pogradec area is very rich in cultural and natural monuments among which can be mentioned
Pogradec Castle
19th and 20th century historical center of the city of Pogradec
Castle of Blace village
Castle of Zemçë village
Fortifications in the village of Slabinjë
Prehistoric settlement of Zagradie in the village of Lin
Bridge near the villages Jollë and Llëngë
Bridge near the village of Golik
Bridge near the village of Niçë
Bridge near the village of Çezmë
Bridge in the village of Zgallë
Bridge in the village of Servatinë
Terziu Bridge in the village of Proptisht
Fortification in the village of Shpellë in Mokra
St. Marina's Monastery in the village of Llëngë
Paleo-Christian church and mosaics in the village of Lin
Byzantine church in the village of Lin
Mosaic in the village of Tushemisht
Drilon water sources and swans park near Tushemisht
Guri i Kamjes in Mokra
The karstic cave and small lake inside it above the village of Hudenisht

Media

Newspapers
''Nositi, founded 1998

Twin towns – sister cities

Pogradec is twinned with:
 Ohrid, North Macedonia
 Wismar, Germany

References

External links 

bashkiapogradec.gov.al – Official Website 

 
Cities in Albania
Administrative units of Pogradec
Municipalities in Korçë County
Populated coastal places in Albania
Illyrian Albania
Albanian Ohrid Lake Coast